AHRMA (American Historic Racing Motorcycle Association) is a not-for-profit organization dedicated to preserving, restoring and  competing on historic motorcycles. With over 3000 members, AHRMA is the leading vintage motorcycle racing group in North America and one of the largest in the world. The association's enthusiastic membership reflects this country's strong interest in classic bikes.

The Origins of AHRMA

The seeds of today's AHRMA were sown in the late 1970s and early 1980s as different groups and individuals began to organize vintage racing on a regional basis. Road racing was the first type of competition to appear, spearheaded in the Northeast by Robert Iannucci and Jeffrey Elghanayan. In the Southeast, Bob and Marrie Barker and Will Harding launched the Historic Motorcycle Racing Association (HMRA). Other groups also began emerging around the nation, adding motocross, trials, flat-track and concours events to the competition options available for vintage riders. In the West, Fred Mork, Dick Mann and Mike Green were nurturing the California Vintage Racing Group (CVRG).

By 1986 it was clear that a national organization would be necessary to administer this burgeoning sport. AHRMA was originally formed as a privately held business corporation. Other groups were brought together under one banner and one set of rules. In 1989 AHRMA was reorganized into the current member-owned not-for-profit association. Along the way, many other individuals and organizations have lent a helping hand. The late Tom McGill, the late Mike Smith, Beno
Rodi, Jeff Elghanyan, Gary Winn, the American Motorcyclist Association, Daytona International Speedway, the Championship Cup Series, BMW of North America and the American Motorcycle Institute are just a few who have contributed greatly toward AHRMA's success.

The AHRMA Organization

AHRMA is governed by a 12-member Board of Trustees, six from east of the Mississippi River and six from west of the Mississippi, elected from and by the membership. Trustees serve three-year terms and may be reelected any number of times.

AHRMA Historic Motorcycle Racing
AHRMA offers vintage National and regional road racing, motocross, dirt track, observed trials and cross country competition. The classic machines active in AHRMA events span a full 70 years, from the 1920s to the early-’90s. The national-championship schedule typically includes at least 15 rounds in each competition discipline. AHRMA Nationals take place at some of the finest and most historic venues in the United States: Road America, Willow Springs, Heartland Motorsports Park, New Jersey Motorsports Park and Barber Motorsports Park, to name a few.

AHRMA Vintage / Modern Road Racing
Many consider the 50-year time span – from the 1930s to the mid-‘70s – the golden age of roadracing. We recognize that the oldest of these motorcycles are the least available; therefore only small numbers are likely to participate in most events, and some events may have no examples. However, AHRMA is committed to maintaining a venue to showcase these early motorcycles, no matter how few.

AHRMA Vintage Motocross
Motocross competition is split into two series. Vintage motocross for machines up to 1974 (with a few exceptions allowed to 1976 if the bike didn't change) which is us usually run on the Saturday of events. Classes cater for all age groups through to the 70+ classes. The second is Post-Vintage motocross which is for machines from 1975 through to the mid 80's. This event is usually run on a Sunday as many riders will compete both days on different machines.

AHRMA Dirt Track
Class C, Brakeless, vintage and Seventies-era classes are all catered for in this form of American Motorcycling that has been around since the early days.
. America is the main country in which this sport is practiced, with the only racing anything like it being Speedway which is mainly raced in the UK, Australia and New Zealand.

AHRMA Observed Trials
Observed Trials competition caters for all vintage and historic Trials motorcycles up to the year 1979. Competitors compete on styles of machinery from Girder fork models all the way through to the late 70's twin shocks, always on period based sections to suit the machinery in use.

AHRMA Cross Country
In the spirit of the ISDT type events and Hare Scrambles of old, AHRMA Cross Country events provide a closed course event reminiscent of what is probably the oldest form of motorcycle sport. Competition is run for both vintage and post-vintage machinery for all skill levels of riders.

References

External links

Motorcycle racing organizations
Sports organizations established in 1984
1984 establishments in the United States
Motorcycle racing in the United States